Stanage Park is a Grade II* listed Welsh country house set in a large park located some  east of Knighton, Powys near the settlement of Heartsease. The extensive parkland and the house were laid out by Humphry Repton and his son, John Adey Repton, in the early nineteenth century. Repton's picturesque parkland improvements, castellated house and enclosed garden survive almost intact. The estate is the last and most complete of his three recognized Welsh landscape commissions.

History
The house was built 1803–07 by the Reptons for Charles Rogers in a picturesque castle style that was explicitly modelled on Richard Payne Knight's Downton Castle. John Repton designed an addition to the rear of the house in 1822. John Hiram Haycock added bay windows and his son Edward Haycock Senior remodelled some of the public rooms in a Tudorbethan style in 1833. Edward Haycock later added a Gothic dining-room extension, Romanesque-style porch and the castellated stable courtyard beginning in 1845. The billiard-room, south wing and baronial tower were added about 1867  The plans for the Repton's work are recorded in a 'Red Book', still kept at the house.

Description
The house is approached through the terraced lawns on the east front and the building has landscaped woodlands with a pond to the west. North and south of the building are wooded hillsides. The eastern terraces are enclosed by a low castellated wall to ha-has and there is a 1900 summer-house at the southeastern corner of the walls. The walls are periodically interrupted with rectangular exedras with classical urns atop piers.

Associations 
 The house and gardens featured in the TV drama series Blott on the Landscape.
 The area is also associated with the burial of the fifth century warlord Vortigern.

References

External links 
  Early Victorian map
 Parks and Gardens - Stanage Park database entry

Houses in Powys
Tourist attractions in Powys
Gardens in Wales
Grade II* listed buildings in Powys
Knighton, Powys
Parks in Powys
Registered historic parks and gardens in Powys
Grade II* listed houses in Wales